Victor Pierrel (born 23 January 1992) is a French para-alpine skier who competes in the LW12.1 category.

Career 
At the 2021 World Para Snow Sports Championships held in Lillehammer, Norway, Pierrel won the silver medal in the men's sitting slalom event.

References 

1992 births
Living people
French male alpine skiers